Henicorhynchus horai is a species of cyprinid fish endemic to Inle Lake in Myanmar.

References

Henicorhynchus
Fish described in 1986
Taxa named by Petre Mihai Bănărescu
Taxobox binomials not recognized by IUCN